The Party of Truth (Hizb al-Haqq) is a Zaydi Islamist political party in Yemen.

History
Established by Ahmad al-Shami in 1990 in order to oppose al-Islah, the party won two seats in the House of Representatives in the 1993 elections, the first after unification. However, the 1997 elections saw its vote share drop from 0.8% to 0.2%, and it lost both seats. In 2002 it joined the opposition Joint Meeting Parties alliance. It received only 0.1% of the vote in the 2003 elections, remaining without parliamentary representation.

References

External links
Official website

1990 establishments in Yemen
Islamic political parties in Yemen
Political parties established in 1990
Political parties in Yemen
Shia Islam in Yemen
Shia Islamic political parties